The Huila New and Liberalism (Huila Nueva y Liberalismo) is a regional political party in Colombia, closely affiliated to the Liberal Party of Colombia. 
At the last legislative elections, 12 March 2006, the party won 2 seats in the Chamber of Representatives. 

Liberal parties in Colombia
Political parties in Colombia